
Gmina Walce, German Gemeinde Walzen is a rural gmina (administrative district) in Krapkowice County, Opole Voivodeship, in south-western Poland.

Since 2006 the commune, like much of the area, has been bilingual in German and Polish, a large German population remaining in the area after Silesia was partitioned to Poland.

Administrative divisions
The commune contains the villages and settlements of:

Walce
Antoszka
Brożec
Brzezina
Ćwiercie
Czerniów
Dobieszowice
Grobla
Grocholub
Kromołów
Krzewiaki
Marianków
Posiłek
Przerwa
Rozkochów
Rybarze
Stradunia
Swornica
Zabierzów

Neighbouring gminas
Gmina Walce is bordered by the gminas of Głogówek, Krapkowice, Reńska Wieś and Zdzieszowice.

Twin towns – sister cities

Gmina Walce is twinned with:
 Kobylnica, Poland
 Malá Morávka, Czech Republic

References

Walce
Krapkowice County
Bilingual communes in Poland

de:Walzen (Oberschlesien)#Gemeinde